Paide is a town in Estonia and the capital of Järva County, one of the 15 counties of Estonia.

Etymology
Paide's German name Weißenstein (originally Wittenstein or Wittensten in Low German) means "white stone". This name was derived from the limestone used for the construction of Paide Castle. A Latin translation, Albus Lapis, has also been used. The Estonian name Paide was first recorded in 1564 as Paida, and is thought to derive from the word paas, pae, meaning "limestone".

Sights

Paide Vallitorn
A castle was built in Paide by order of Konrad von Mandern, master of the Livonian Order, sometime in 1265 or 1266. It was from the beginning constructed around the central tower or keep, locally known as Tall Hermann tower or Vallitorn. With its six storeys, the tower has always been the core of the castle complex. The fortress was strengthened during the 14th and 15th centuries, when the surrounding walls were enlarged and towers added. It was also modernised to be able to meet the new threat of firearms. During the 16th century, the castle was again modified through the addition of outer bastions.

During the Livonian War, the castle was repeatedly besieged by Russian troops, and in 1573 it was occupied by troops loyal to Ivan the Terrible. After that, the castle changed hands several times. It was also involved in the fighting during the 1600-1611 Polish-Swedish War, in the so-called Siege of Weissenstein.

In 1895-1897 restoration work was carried out on the central tower and some other parts of the castle. However, in 1941, during World War II, retreating Soviet troops blew up the central tower and it was not repaired until after Estonia regained its independence, in 1990–1993.

Today the restored central tower houses a part of Järva County museum.

Paide Church
Paide Church originally dates from the 16th century; however, it has been very badly damaged in both war and fire on several occasions, and the present-day building dates mainly from a reconstruction which took place in 1909-1910 under the supervision of architect J. C. Mühlhausen.

Sports
Paide is home to Paide linnastaadion, the home ground of Meistriliiga football team Paide Linnameeskond.

Notable residents
Ita Ever, stage and film actress
Helle-Reet Helenurm, actress
Johannes Hesse, father of author Hermann Hesse
Tullio Ilomets, chemist 
Ekaterina Kalinina, Bolshevik revolutionary and civil servant, wife of the Soviet head of state Mikhail Kalinin
Carmen Kass, model
Kalle Kiik, chess International Master
Andres Noormets, actor and stage director
Arvo Pärt, classical music composer
Toomas Raudam, writer
Mati Sirkel, translator and writer
Karin Tammaru, actress

Gallery

See also
Siege of Weissenstein

References

External links

Ühendus Weissenstein 
Webcam from Paide keskväljak

 
Cities and towns in Estonia
Castles of the Livonian Order
Populated places established in the 13th century
1291 establishments in Europe
13th-century establishments in Estonia
Kreis Jerwen
Populated places in Järva County